Tlatelolco may refer to:

Tlatelolco (altepetl), a pre-Columbian Aztec citystate
Tlatelolco (archaeological site), an archaeological site in Mexico City, location of the Aztec citystate
Tlatelolco, Mexico City, an area in the Cuauhtémoc borough of Mexico City
Conjunto Urbano Nonoalco Tlatelolco, mega apartment complex
 The Tlatelolco massacre of 1968 in which Mexican police and military forces killed more than 300 protesting students
Tlatelolco metro station, a station on the Mexico City Metro
Tlatelolco (Mexico City Metrobús), a BRT station in Mexico City
Treaty of Tlatelolco, a treaty for the prohibition of nuclear weapons in Latin America and the Caribbean
Codex of Tlatelolco, a pictorial central Mexican manuscript
Topos de Tlatelolco, a rescue brigade